Davida Frances Allen (born 20 October 1951) is an Australian painter, filmmaker and writer.

Early life and education
Davida Allen was born on 20 October 1951 in Charleville, Queensland.

She studied under Betty Churcher at the Stuartholme School, Brisbane (1965–69) and later under Roy Churcher (Betty Churcher's husband) at Brisbane Central Technical College (1970–72).

Career
Allen has written and illustrated two books, and has created a 50-minute film, Feeling Sexy (1999), on the struggles of an artist attempting to reconcile the conflicting demands of bohemia and suburbia. The film was invited to the Venice Film Festival.

She frequently confronts the themes of family and sexuality; regarding the latter she has said: "if we are truly feminist in the fullest sense of the word, we shouldn't have felt we had to lock it away or be really careful about it. We should be chauvinist in our womanhood."

Allen is represented in all major public collections in Australia, and the Museum of New Zealand Te Papa Tongarewa.

Awards and nominations 

 1986: Archibald Prize, for her portrait of her father-in-law, John Shera (My father-in-law watering his garden)
1999: Film Critics Circle of Australia Awards, nominated for "Best Direction", won "Best Original Screenplay" award
 2010: Tattersalls Club Landscape Art Prize

Exhibitions

Australian exhibitions

Solo exhibitions
 College Gallery (Brisbane College of Advanced Education), 1984
 Museum of Contemporary Art in South Brisbane, 1987, a major retrospective survey
 Griffith University Art Museum, Brisbane, 2018

Group exhibitions 
 Ray Hughes Gallery at Pinacotheca, Pinacotheca Art Gallery (Richmond, Victoria), 1981
 Nine Queensland artists, Perc Tucker Regional Gallery, Townsville, 1981
 Contemporary Art in Australia – A Review, inaugural exhibition of the Museum of Contemporary Art in South Brisbane, 1987
 Blue chip X : the collectors' exhibition, Niagara Galleries, Melbourne, 2008

Commercial galleries
 Ray Hughes Gallery, Brisbane, in 1973, 1975, 1978, 1979, 1981, 1982, 1985 and 1986
 Australian Galleries, Sydney, in 1993, 1996, 2001
 Philip Bacon Galleries, Brisbane, in 1999, 2001, 2003, 2005, 2008, 2010, 2012, 2014, 2016.

International group exhibitions 
 D'un autre continent: l'Australie le rêve er le réel, curated by Suzanne Page/Leon Paroissien, Musée d'Art Moderne de la Ville de Paris; shown internationally in Vienna, Texas and Venice (1983)
 An international survey of recent painting and sculpture, curated by Kynaston McShine, Museum of Modern Art (MoMA), New York City (1984)
 Kunst mit Eigen-Sinn, curated by Silvia Eiblmayr, Valie Export, Monika Prischl-Maier, Museum des 20. Jahrhunderts (Museum of the 20th Century), Vienna (1985)
 Davida Allen, curated by Anne Kirker, National Art Gallery of New Zealand; touring to four other New Zealand museums: Sarjeant Gallery, Wanganui; Fisher Gallery, Pakuranga, Auckland; Govett-Brewster Art Gallery, New Plymouth; Manawatu Art Gallery, Palmerston North (1986)
 Painters and sculptors, curated by Michael Sourgnes, Queensland Art Gallery, Brisbane; travelling to Museum of Contemporary Art, Saitama, Japan (1987)
 ROSC, an International Exhibition, Dublin, Ireland (1988)

References

External links
 
 Davida Allen at Design & Art Australia Online
 Profile and artworks, Philip Bacon Galleries

1951 births
Living people
Archibald Prize winners
Artists from Queensland
Australian women painters
20th-century Australian women artists
20th-century Australian artists
21st-century Australian women artists
21st-century Australian artists
Neo-expressionist artists